San Maha Phon is a tambon (subdistrict) of Mae Taeng District, in Chiang Mai Province, Thailand. In 2020 it had a total population of 6,425 people.

Administration

Central administration
The tambon is subdivided into 10 administrative villages (muban).

Local administration
The whole area of the subdistrict is covered by the subdistrict municipality (Thesaban Tambon) San Maha Phon (เทศบาลตำบลสันมหาพน).

References

External links
Thaitambon.com on San Maha Phon

Tambon of Chiang Mai province
Populated places in Chiang Mai province